George Street Bridge may refer to:

George Street Bridge, Newport
George Street Bridge (Aurora, Indiana)
George Street Bridge, Dunedin, New Zealand

See also
George Street (disambiguation)
George Bridge (disambiguation)
George (disambiguation)